LitPol Link is an electricity link between Poland and Lithuania which connects the Baltic transmission system to the synchronous grid of Continental Europe. It has a capacity of 500 MW and since 2021 it can operate in a synchronous regime.

History
In 2000, European Commission and the EBRD agreed to finance a feasibility study on the Poland–Lithuania transmission interconnection. The study was completed in September 2002. The connection is expected to increase Poland's electricity interconnection level from 2% to 4%. Parts of LitPol are on the EU "Projects of Common Interest" list in November 2015.

On 29 September 2006 Polish President Lech Kaczyński and Lithuanian President Valdas Adamkus signed a joint declaration on the joint power grid project during their meeting in Warsaw. The memorandum of understanding to establish a joint interconnection operator was signed between Lietuvos Energija and Polish PSE-Operator in Vilnius on 8 December 2006. Project Company Shareholding Agreement signed on 12 February 2008 in Warsaw. The joint project company LitPol Link was founded on 19 May 2008.

Aiming to build a 400 kV overhead line between Ełk and Łomża  PSE-Operator signed a contract with the Polish construction company PBE ELBUD Group on 12 September 2011. During start of 2013 Lithuanian transmission system operator Litgrid awarded ABB Group a $110 million contract to supply and install the first HVDC converter station in proximity of Alytus, Lithuania.

Construction of the link commenced in the Alytus district on 5 May 2014.  LitPol electricity link started operations on 9 December 2015 the same day transmitting up to 200 MW power from Poland to Lithuania.

The second part of project (another 500 MW capacity link) is planned to have a different route through Marijampolė. The full plan of second part was scheduled to be reviewed at the end of 2016.

Technical features
The interconnection comprises a  double-circuit 330 kV line from Kruonis to Alytus, a 1000 MW back-to-back converter in Alytus and  double-circuit 400 kV line from Alytus to the Lithuania–Poland border on the Lithuanian side, and a  double-circuit 400 kV line from the border to Ełk on Polish side.

According to the pre-feasibility study, the cost of the interconnection was estimated to be €237 million. With a view to enhancing existing energy infrastructure, including Poland–Germany and Poland–Czech Republic upgrades, tge Polish TSO invested an additional €650 million and the Lithuanian TSO €262 million. The Lithuania–Poland interconnection has been designated an EU Trans-European Networks project. The interconnection initial capacity is 500 MW, with a transmission capacity upgrade of up to 1000 MW possible after completion of a second HVDC back-to-back station.

The tower 61 near Ełk, tower 160, tower 166 (both near Suwalki), and tower 293 near Sankury, have a height of 107 metres.

HVDC Back-to-back station
It consists of two converters each rated for 500 MW transmission power.

Project company
LitPol Link was founded by PSE-Operator and Litgrid with equal stakes. The company is based in Warsaw.  Acting Managing Director of LitPol Link Mr. Artūras Vilimas.

See also
 Energy in Lithuania
 Estlink (between Estonia and Finland)
 NordBalt (between Lithuania and Sweden)
 SwePol (between Poland and Sweden)
 Lithuania–Poland pipeline (natural gas interconnection between Lithuania and Poland)
 Harmony Link, subsea cable between Lithuania and Poland

References

External links
 LitPol Link on Archive.org

2015 establishments in Lithuania
2015 establishments in Poland
Electrical interconnectors to and from the Baltic grid
Electric power transmission systems in Lithuania
Electric power infrastructure in Poland
Converter stations
High-voltage transmission lines